The 2015–16 Andebol 1 (also known as Fidelidade Andebol 1 for sponsorship reasons) was the 64th season of the Portuguese Handball First Division, the premier professional handball league in Portugal. A total of twelve teams contested the league, which began on 5 September 2015 and concluded on 4 June 2016.

ABC Braga beat Benfica 3–2 in the playoff finals to win their 13th national championship title, nine years after their previous triumph. Seven-time defending champions Porto were eliminated by Benfica in the semi-finals.

Format
The competition format for the 2015–16 season consisted of two phases. The first phase was contested under a double round-robin system, with teams playing against each other home and away. In the second phase, the eight top-ranked teams from the first phase competed in the championship playoffs, while the remaining four teams played a mini-tournament to decide the two teams being relegated to the Second Division.

Teams

A total of twelve teams contested the league, including ten sides from the previous season. The remaining two teams, Avanca and Fafe, were promoted from the 2014–15 Second Division, replacing the relegated sides of Santo Tirso and Xico Andebol.

First phase

Standings

Results

Second phase

Playoffs

5th–8th classification

Relegation group

References

External links
 Portuguese Handball Federation 

Andebol 1
Portugal